Jenny-Wanda Barkmann (30 May 1922 – 4 July 1946) was a German overseer in Nazi concentration camps during World War II. She was tried and executed for crimes against humanity after the war.

Biography 
Barkmann is believed to have spent her childhood in Hamburg. In 1944, she became an Aufseherin, or overseer, in the Stutthof SK-III women's subcamp, where she brutalized prisoners, some to death. She also selected women and children for the gas chambers. She was so merciless that the women prisoners nicknamed her the "Beautiful Specter".

Barkmann fled Stutthof as the Soviet Red Army approached. She was arrested in May 1945 while trying to leave a train station in Gdańsk. She became a defendant in the first Stutthof Trial, where she and other defendants were convicted for their crimes at the camp. Barkmann is said to have giggled through the trial, flirted with her prison guards; she was apparently seen arranging her hair while hearing testimony. She was found guilty, after which she declared, "Life is indeed a pleasure, and pleasures are usually short."

Barkmann was publicly executed by short-drop hanging along with 10 other defendants from the trial on Biskupia Górka Hill near Gdańsk on 4 July 1946. She was 24 years old, and the first to be hanged.

In popular culture 
 In the play Maidens written and directed by Kenley Smith, she is portrayed by Molly Breen.

See also 
 Female guards in Nazi concentration camps

References

External links

1922 births
1946 deaths
Holocaust perpetrators in Poland
Executed German women
Stutthof trials executions
Female guards in Nazi concentration camps
Filmed executions
Executed people from Hamburg
Publicly executed people

People executed for crimes against humanity
Executed mass murderers